This is a list of casinos in Iowa.

List of casinos

See also

 List of casinos in the United States
 List of casino hotels

References

External links

 
Casinos
Iowa